Galerius Valerius Maximinus, born as Daza (20 November  270 –  July 313), was Roman emperor from 310 to 313. He became embroiled in the Civil wars of the Tetrarchy between rival claimants for control of the empire, in which he was defeated by Licinius. A committed pagan, he engaged in one of the last persecutions of Christians, before issuing an edict of tolerance near his death.

Name
The emperor Maximinus was originally called Maximinus Daza, a common name in Illyria, where he was born. The form "Daia" given by the Christian pamphleteer Lactantius, an important source on the emperor's life, is considered a misspelling and deprecated. He acquired the name Maximinus Daza at the request of his maternal uncle, Galerius, and his full name as emperor was Galerius Valerius Maximinus. Modern scholarship often refers to him as Maximinus Daza, though this particular form is not attested by epigraphic or literary evidence.

Early career
He was born in the Roman Illyria region to the sister of emperor Galerius near their family lands around Felix Romuliana, in Dacia Ripensis, a rural area then also in the former Danubian region of Moesia, now modern Eastern Serbia. He rose to high distinction after joining the Roman Army.

In 305, his maternal uncle Galerius became the eastern Augustus and adopted Maximinus, raising him to the rank of Caesar (that is, the junior eastern ruler), and granting him the government of Syria and Egypt.

Civil war
In 308, after the elevation of Licinius to Augustus, Maximinus and Constantine I were declared filii Augustorum ("sons of the Augusti"), but Maximinus probably started styling himself as Augustus during a campaign against the Sassanids in 310. On the death of Galerius in 311, Maximinus divided the Eastern Empire between Licinius and himself. When Licinius and Constantine I began to make common cause, Maximinus entered into a secret alliance with the usurper Maxentius, who controlled Italy. He came to an open rupture with Licinius in 313; he summoned an army of 70,000 men but sustained a crushing defeat at the Battle of Tzirallum in the neighbourhood of Heraclea Perinthus on 30 April. He fled, first to Nicomedia and afterwards to Tarsus, where he died the following August.

Persecution of Christians
Maximinus has a bad name in Christian annals for renewing their persecution after the publication of the Edict of Toleration by Galerius, acting in response to the demands of various urban authorities asking to expel Christians. In one rescript replying to a petition made by the inhabitants of Tyre, transcribed by Eusebius of Caesarea, Maximinus expounds a pagan orthodoxy, explaining that it is through "the kindly care of the gods" that one could hope for good crops, health, and the peaceful sea, and that not being the case, one should blame "the destructive error of the empty vanity of those impious men [that] weighed down the whole world with shame". In one extant inscription (CIL III.12132, from Arycanda) from the cities of Lycia and Pamphylia asking for the interdiction of the Christians, Maximinus replied, in another inscription, by expressing his hope that "may those [...] who, after being freed from [...] those by-ways [...] rejoice [as] snatched from a grave illness".

After the victory of Constantine over Maxentius, however, Maximinus wrote to the Praetorian Prefect Sabinus that it was better to "recall our provincials to the worship of the gods rather by exhortations and flatteries". Eventually, on the eve of his clash with Licinius, he accepted Galerius' edict; after being defeated by Licinius, shortly before his death at Tarsus, he issued an edict of tolerance on his own, granting Christians the rights of assembling, of building churches, and the restoration of their confiscated properties.

Pharaoh of Egypt

As Christianity continued to spread in Egypt, the title of Pharaoh was increasingly incompatible with the new religious movements. Maximinus Daza's status as a non-Christian accorded the priests of Egypt an opportunity to style him as Pharaoh, in the same manner that other foreign rulers of Egypt had been styled before. That said, the Roman emperors themselves mostly ignored the status accorded to them by the Egyptians; and their role as god-kings was only ever acknowledged domestically by the Egyptians themselves. Maximinus Daza would prove to be the last person afforded the title of Pharaoh – no Christian Roman/Byzantine emperor, nor Islamic leader, continued the ancient tradition of the pharaonic god-king of Egypt.

Death
Maximinus' death was variously ascribed "to despair, to poison, and to the divine justice".

Based on descriptions of his death given by Eusebius, and Lactantius as well as the appearance of Graves' ophthalmopathy in a Tetrarchic statue bust from Anthribis in Egypt sometimes attributed to Maximinus, endocrinologist Peter D. Papapetrou has advanced a theory that Maximinus may have died from severe thyrotoxicosis due to Graves' disease.

Maximinus was the last Roman emperor, and thus the last individual, to hold the title of pharaoh, making his death the end of a 3,400-year-old office.

Maximinus probably married a relative of his uncle Galerius, possibly a daughter or granddaughter. Their two children, a son (Maximus) and a daughter, were probably put to death by the emperor Licinius; however, there is no evidence of his children being killed or put to death.

Eusebius on Maximinus
The Christian writer Eusebius claims that Maximinus was consumed by avarice and superstition. He also allegedly lived a highly dissolute lifestyle:

And he went to such an excess of folly and drunkenness that his mind was deranged and crazed in his carousals; and he gave commands when intoxicated of which he repented afterward when sober. He suffered no one to surpass him in debauchery and profligacy, but made himself an instructor in wickedness to those about him, both rulers and subjects. He urged on the army to live wantonly in every kind of revelry and intemperance, and encouraged the governors and generals to abuse their subjects with rapacity and covetousness, almost as if they were rulers with him.
Why need we relate the licentious, shameless deeds of the man, or enumerate the multitude with whom he committed adultery? For he could not pass through a city without continually corrupting women and ravishing virgins.

According to Eusebius, only Christians resisted him.

For the men endured fire and sword and crucifixion and wild beasts and the depths of the sea, and cutting off of limbs, and burnings, and pricking and digging out of eyes, and mutilations of the entire body, and besides these, hunger and mines and bonds. In all they showed patience in behalf of religion rather than transfer to idols the reverence due to God.
And the women were not less manly than the men in behalf of the teaching of the Divine Word, as they endured conflicts with the men, and bore away equal prizes of virtue. And when they were dragged away for corrupt purposes, they surrendered their lives to death rather than their bodies to impurity.

He refers to one high-born Christian woman who rejected his advances. He exiled her and seized all of her wealth and assets. Eusebius does not give the girl a name, but Tyrannius Rufinus calls her "Dorothea," and writes that she fled to Arabia. This story may have evolved into the legend of Dorothea of Alexandria. Caesar Baronius identified the girl in Eusebius' account with Catherine of Alexandria, but the Bollandists rejected this theory.

Family tree

See also
List of Roman emperors
Civil wars of the Tetrarchy

Notes

References

Sources

 
 
 

 
 
 
 

 Oxford Classical Dictionary, "Maximinus, Gaius Galerius Valerius"

3rd-century births
313 deaths
4th-century Roman consuls
4th-century Roman emperors
Galerii
Roman pharaohs
Tetrarchy
Valerii